Fred Wilkinson may refer to:
 Fred Wilkinson (footballer) (1889–?), British footballer
 Fred Wilkinson (speedway rider) (1906–1978), British speedway rider

See also
 Frederick Wilkinson (1896–1980), Bishop of Toronto
 Frederick Green Wilkinson (1825–1913), British Army officer
 Freddy Wilkinson (1878–?), English footballer